Sì (pronounced , , transcribed as sì in Foochow Romanized) is a traditional spherical dessert made from glutinous rice, eaten in celebration of the Winter Solstice festival in Fuzhou, Fujian Province, China. It is usually produced without filling, in contrast to the tangyuan. The sì is made by grinding glutinous rice into a powder, pressing the powder until almost dry, and then rolling the dry powder into a spherical shape, and finally add fried (even burnt) soybean powder mixed with brown sugar onto the glutinous rice sphere.

The pronunciation of 𥻵 is the same as 時 (time, fortune) in Fuzhou dialect of Chinese. The "turn" in fortune is embodied in a well-known chengyu, often linked to the Winter Solstice, which in the Fuzhou dialect is pronounced the same as "[when] sì comes, fortune turns" (BUC: sì-lài-ông-diōng). As a result of these homophones, many Fuzhou people believe that eating sì may result in good fortune.

Folk rhyme

References

Fuzhou
Fujian cuisine
Glutinous rice dishes
Chinese rice dishes
Chinese desserts
Dumplings
Holiday foods